Cloudstreet  is an Australian television drama miniseries for the Showcase subscription television channel, which first screened from 22 May 2011, in three parts. It is an adaptation of Cloudstreet, an award-winning novel by Australian author Tim Winton. It was filmed in 2010 in Perth, Western Australia, with Matthew Saville as the director, and script written by Tim Winton and Ellen Fontana.

Plot and context
After separate personal tragedies, two families flee their rural lives to share a "great continent of a house", Cloudstreet, in the Perth suburb of West Leederville. The two families are very different; the Lambs find meaning in industry and in God's grace; the Pickles, in luck. Although at first the two families do not warm to each other, their separate paths and search for meaning in life ends with the uniting of the two families.

Cloudstreet is set in the mid-1940s to late 1950s. Although the families are influenced by world events, the story focuses on their domestic and personal lives. A recurring motif in the series involves the stolen generations of Aboriginal children, some of whom had been harshly treated in the house the two families now inhabit.

Cast

The Pickles
Dolly Pickles - Essie Davis
Sam Pickles - Stephen Curry
Rose Pickles - Emma Booth
Young Rose Pickles - Lara Robinson
Ted Pickles - Sean Keenan
Young Ted Pickles - Will Mattock
Chub Pickles - Shannon Lively
Young Chub Pickles - Reece Sardelic

The Lambs
Lester Lamb - Geoff Morrell
Oriel Lamb - Kerry Fox
Fish Lamb - Hugo Johnstone-Burt
Young Fish Lamb - Tom Russell
Quick Lamb - Todd Lasance
Young Quick Lamb - Callan McAuliffe
Young Hat Lamb - Freya Tingley
Hat Lamb - Siobhan Dow-Hall
Young Elaine Lamb - Annie Smith
Elaine Lamb - Sarah McKellar
Lon Lamb - Adam Sollis
Red Lamb - Amanda Woodhams

Additional cast

Narration by Ron Haddrick
Greg McNeill as Trainer
Milly Haddrick as Trainer's Daughter
Ben Mortley as Gerry Clay
 Bruce Spence as Pig
 Kelton Pell as Bob Crab
Shaquita Nannup as Florrie
Billie-Jean Hamlet as Ruby
Michelle Stanley as Mrs Johnson
Julia Moody as Mrs Tisborn
Anna Bauert as Alma
Sarah Louella as Darlene
Natalie Holmwood as Merle
Melanie Munt as Mrs Clay
 Oliver Ackland as Toby Raven
Ethan Thomas as Geoffrey Birch
Laura Fairclough as Lucy Wentworth
David Bowers as Earl Blunt
Helen Doig as May Blunt
Richard Adams as Spinner
Jodie Mead as Aboriginal Woman
Sean Walsh as Bloke
Matthew Elverd as Bloke
Angelique Malcolm as Housewife
John McKenzie as Sam's Hand Double

Production
It is an adaptation of Cloudstreet, an award-winning novel by Australian author Tim Winton. It was filmed in 2010 in Perth, Western Australia, with Matthew Saville as the director, and script written by Tim Winton and Ellen Fontana.

Three generations of the Sydney-based Haddrick family were involved in the production of Cloudstreet: Ron Haddrick as the narrator; Greg Haddrick as producer; and Milly Haddrick as an actress.

Release
The three-part series premiered in Australia on 22 May 2011.

The series was screened in the UK from January 2012, distributed by Sky Atlantic.

Reception 
David Knox from Tvtonight.com stated: "There are visuals, concepts and performances that surpass the usual small screen dramas which stick to pedestrian storytelling and talking heads. Cloudstreet is bursting with character, imagination and offers a cornucopia for the eye."

The Sydney Morning Herald'''s Brad Newsome wrote: "The production and costume designs are wonderful, as is the original music by Bryony Marks (who also provided the haunting score for Tangle). Director Matthew Saville (Noise, The King) and cinematographer Mark Wareham (Clubland, Answered by Fire'') bring it all to vivid, entrancing life. Outstanding."

References

Further reading

External links
 

Showcase (Australian TV channel) original programming
2010s Australian television miniseries
2011 Australian television series debuts
2011 Australian television series endings
Television series by Screentime